Shhiim alternatively written as Shheem or Chhim/Shleem is a town in Lebanon which is located 40 kilometres south-east of Beirut. Shhiim is located on 4 mountains in the Chouf region in lebanon. Chhim has a population of about 49,000. It is considered a city by some.

Shhiim is the largest Sunni Muslim town in the Chouf region. It is often regarded as the capital of the Iklim el-Kharoub which is the coastal part of the Chouf.

Shhiim has warm, dry and humid summers, with cold and wet winters. The weather is similar to that of the coastal cities.  

Politics in the area is dominated by the Future Movement and the Progressive Socialist Party, with two MPs from Shhiim taking on a role for each respective party.

Shhiim is often confused within size due to many parts of it having different names; some more familiar parts of Shhiim include Marj-Ali, Sahle, Jabal Swed, Chamis and Jirid. These and many others are part of Shhiim but have different names.

Shhiim contains 11 schools, 8 of which are public. It also has two hospitals, one public and one private.

Features
Shhiim contains many mosques and is mostly inhabited by Sunni Muslims. It is the site of one of many Temples of the Beqaa Valley.

In the era of prosperity in the 2nd century AD, the villagers of Shleem decided to erect a roman temple on the southern end of the settlement. A small edifice built in the Corinthian style probably matched their rising ambitions. We do not know what deity was worshiped there, but its long-standing cult ended with the arrival of Christianity. The temple was abandoned, and a church was built opposite it at the end of the 5th century.

Archaeological site

The archaeological site lies on a slope of a hill on the outskirts of the city. It is a Roman-Byzantine village with a Roman temple towering above the rest of the ancient architecture. The temple faces east and has a small porch. There is a carving of the sun god Helios on one of the doorframes. Another carving portrays the image of a priest with outstretched arms.

Haroutune Kalayan reconstructed the temple in the 1970s, and in the 1990s, Renata Ortali Tarazi from the Directorate General of Antiquities of Lebanon (DGA) undertook the task of site preservation. She started a three-way cooperation with the Institut français du Proche-Orient (IFPO), represented by Lévon Nordiguian, and the Polish Centre of Mediterranean Archaeology, University of Warsaw (PCMA UW). An archaeological expedition, established in 1996, worked on the site for more than 20 years under the direction of Tomasz Waliszewski from the PCMA UW.

The settlement was founded at the turn of the eras, although the oldest finds date to the Bronze Age. Parts of the village are remarkably well preserved. Apart from the Roman temple, archaeologists discovered houses clustered along narrow streets, oil presses, and a Christian basilica with mosaics, dated to AD 498. A necropolis surrounded the settlement. The village ceased to function in the 7th century.

Multicolored mosaics covering the whole floor of the basilica are among the most spectacular discoveries made on the site. Most of them depict geometrical patterns, but floral and figural motifs also occur; birds and vessels appear on the surfaces between columns. In the central part of the presbytery, there is a mosaic with a lioness, and in the west aisle, a panel with two antelopes. The iconography of these mosaics bears many similarities to other Byzantine churches in the province of Phoenicia, e.g., in Zahrani and Ghiné. The conservation and protection of the mosaics were carried out by specialists from the Academy of Fine Arts in Warsaw (ASP). The majority of the mosaics from Chhim are currently on display in Lebanese museums.

Footnotes

References 

 Waliszewski, T. and Wicenciak, U. (2015). Chhim, Lebanon: a Roman and Late Antique village in the Sidon hinterland. Journal of Eastern Mediterranean Archaeology & Heritage Studies, 3(4).
 Waliszewski T. and Ortali-Tarazi R., 2000 ans d’Historie au cœur d’un village antique du Liban. Catalogue de l'exposition Palais de Beiteddine 7 septembre 2002 - 7 janvier 2003.
 Waliszewski, T. and Kowalski, S. P. (1997). Chhim-Jiyeh excavations 1996. Polish Archaeology in the Mediterranean, 8.

External links
 Shhiim, Localiban
Chhîm, PCMA UW

Populated places in Chouf District
Sunni Muslim communities in Lebanon
Archaeological sites in Lebanon
Ancient Roman temples
Roman sites in Lebanon
Tourist attractions in Lebanon